is a traditional form of underwear for women of all ages worn among Hindu women in Kerala (the southernmost state of India).  is a dothi (sarong) tied in such a way that it is tight, and can't be accidentally untied.

Specifications
A cotton (handloom) cloth of size 6  × 3  (1  = 1.5 ft approximately) is used to drape around the waist, in a particular style under the outer garment (pavada, saree, or mundu).

Other names
 is also called  in some parts of the state. The word is more often used in the southern part of Kerala;  is mostly a northern Kerala usage.

History
In the olden days, tradition said that people should visit the temple in the morning and evening, wearing , because having a dip and coming to temple with wet garments was strictly prohibited as it exhibited the body parts to others. Both men and women wore it, but women in particular wore it at home and as an inner garment while going out.

Nowadays it is increasingly being used by women of all classes of society.

Medical benefits
 provides enough support and covers the vulva completely, giving enough space for absorption of secretions and at the same time giving ample space for air circulation as it is worn loose in those areas.  Even during menstruation, it prevents leakage from the sides and a feeling of uneasiness due to its breadth.

References

Kerala clothing
Undergarments